Ksenia Alekseyevna Alopina (born 30 May 1992 in Beloretsk, Russia) is a Russian alpine ski racer.

She competed at the 2015 World Championships in Beaver Creek, USA, in the slalom.

References

1992 births
Living people
Olympic alpine skiers of Russia
Alpine skiers at the 2014 Winter Olympics
Russian female alpine skiers
People from Beloretsk
Sportspeople from Bashkortostan